Newport is a community located within the city of Madison in Madison County, Illinois, United States.

History
Newport was laid out in 1858.

References

Populated places in Madison County, Illinois
Neighborhoods in Illinois